Promise Amukamara (born 22 June 1993) is a Nigerian-American basketball player for Charnay Basket Bourgogne SUD (FRA)‎ and the Nigerian national team.

Early life and education 
Promise's height is 5 feet, 9 inches (175 cm). She is a graduate of Arizona State University. She is also the younger sister of Super Bowl XLVI Champion, former New York Giants cornerback Prince Amukamara.

Career 
Promise was a member of D’Tigress, Nigeria’s female basketball team. She was the point-guard of the team that played at the 2020 Olympic Games in Tokyo. She also participated at the 2018 FIBA Women's Basketball World Cup.

Achievements 

 10 points per game at Tokyo, 2020 
 The first Arizona State University graduate women’s basketball player to make an Olympic team 
 Member of the 2019 FIBA African Championship Gold Medal team that participated in the Pre-Olympic Qualifying Tournament 
 Arizona’s Gatorade Girls Basketball Player of the Year in 2011 
 The fastest 100 meters and 200 meters by a freshman in the high school

References

External links

Arizona State Sun Devils bio

1993 births
Living people
Arizona State Sun Devils women's basketball players
Basketball players at the 2020 Summer Olympics
Basketball players from New Jersey
Nigerian expatriate basketball people in Germany
Nigerian expatriate basketball people in Romania
Nigerian expatriate basketball people in Spain
Nigerian expatriate basketball people in the United States
Nigerian women's basketball players
Olympic basketball players of Nigeria
Citizens of Nigeria through descent
American expatriate basketball people in Germany
American expatriate basketball people in Romania
American expatriate basketball people in Spain
American women's basketball players
African-American basketball players
Nigerian people of African-American descent
American emigrants to Nigeria
American sportspeople of Nigerian descent
Phoenix Mercury draft picks
Point guards
21st-century African-American sportspeople